The Bradford Smith Building was a historic building at 1927–1941 Purchase Street in New Bedford, Massachusetts.  It was a -story wood-frame structure, with a double-gabled roof and a stone-and-brick foundation.  It was built in 1887 by Bradford Smith, a retired employee of the Taunton-New Bedford Copper Company, and housed retail space on the first floor and apartments above.

The building was listed on the National Register of Historic Places in 1984, and was included in the Acushnet Heights Historic District in 1989.  It underwent a certified rehabilitation for use as senior housing in 1985.  It has since been demolished.

See also
National Register of Historic Places listings in New Bedford, Massachusetts

References

Commercial buildings on the National Register of Historic Places in Massachusetts
Buildings and structures in New Bedford, Massachusetts
Demolished buildings and structures in Massachusetts
National Register of Historic Places in New Bedford, Massachusetts
Commercial buildings completed in 1887
Individually listed contributing properties to historic districts on the National Register in Massachusetts